Arnfinn Bergmann (14 October 1928 – 13 February 2011) was a ski jumper from Norway. He won the individual large hill event at the 1952 Olympics and 1952 Holmenkollen ski festival and placed third at the 1950 World Championships. In 1956 he was awarded the Holmenkollen medal (shared with Borghild Niskin and Arne Hoel).

As a junior Bergmann won the national title and the ski jumping competition in Holmenkollen in 1948. The same year he won the national football title with SK Freidig. Next year he started competing as a senior and placed third at the national championships. In 1950 he was included to the national team and unexpectedly won a bronze medal at the world championships. For the 1950–51 season he stayed in Canada, where he won his every competition. In 1952 he returned to Norway and won the Olympic gold medal, the Holmenkollen and the national championships. He defended his national title in 1953, but got injured in early 1954 and missed the season. He qualified for the 1956 Olympics, but withdrew due to a flu. In 1958 he was included to the 1958 World Championships team, after he unexpectedly won the national title, but he withdrew again, for unknown reasons. He retired in 1959 after placing third at the national championships.

In 1956 Bergmann moved from Trondheim to Oslo, and for the next 30 years worked as a school teacher in Oslo and Bærum. After that he returned to Trondheim and spent the rest of his active life on maintaining the local ski museum.

References

External links

 
 Holmenkollen medalists – click Holmenkollmedaljen for downloadable pdf file 
 Holmenkollen winners since 1892 – click Vinnere for downloadable pdf file 

1928 births
2011 deaths
Sportspeople from Trondheim
Ski jumpers at the 1952 Winter Olympics
Olympic ski jumpers of Norway
Olympic gold medalists for Norway
Holmenkollen Ski Festival winners
Olympic medalists in ski jumping
FIS Nordic World Ski Championships medalists in ski jumping
Medalists at the 1952 Winter Olympics